Dick Palmer may refer to:

 Dick Palmer (broadcaster), American radio broadcaster
 Dick Palmer (American football) (born 1947), American former linebacker
 Mimmo Palmara (1928–2016), Italian actor, sometimes credited as Dick Palmer

See also
 Richard Palmer (disambiguation)